Bjørn Gundersen (17 January 1924 – 1 August 2002) was a Norwegian high jumper who represented Elverum IL.
 
At the 1952 Summer Olympics he finished eighth in the high jump final with a jump of 1.90 metres. He became Norwegian champion in 1947, 1951 and 1954.

His personal best jump was 1.96 metres, achieved in August 1954, in Elverum.

References

1924 births
2002 deaths
Norwegian male high jumpers
Athletes (track and field) at the 1948 Summer Olympics
Athletes (track and field) at the 1952 Summer Olympics
Olympic athletes of Norway